Gondangdia Station (GDD) is a railway station serving by Jakarta Commuterline at Gondangdia, Menteng, Central Jakarta, Indonesia.

The location is quite strategic because it is near office areas. On the lower floor of the station complex there used to be stalls occupied by traders who paid rent to PT Kereta Api, but now these commercial spaces have been demolished. The head office of PT Kereta Api Logistik (Kalog) is also located at this station. The area around the station is being renovated to strengthen public transportation integration (with TransJakarta), rearrange the street vendors around the station and make it easier for pedestrians to access. Estimated to be completed in 2021, this arrangement is being carried out by PT Moda Integrasi Transportasi Jakarta, a joint venture between the Jakarta MRT and PT KAI.

History 
Gondangdia Station was originally a small railway stop that was built as a replacement for the Dierentuin railway stop. At that time, the Batavia City Council considered the location of the Dierentuin Stop to be bizarre and impractical for the development of the Gondangdia and Menteng areas. So that the Batavia City Council ordered the Staatsspoorwegen (SS) to build a new railway stop as a replacement for the Dierentuin Stop. SS built 2 small railway stops located in Gondangdia and Menteng respectively. This railway stop was inaugurated in 1926 and is strategically located because it is next to the N.V. de Bouwploeg.

The active Gondangdia Station is now an elevated station on the Jakarta Kota–Manggarai elevated railway. On 5 June 1992, President Soeharto along with Mrs. Tien Soeharto and the ranks in the government inaugurated the elevated railway by taking the KRL from Gambir to Jakarta Kota Station.

Building and layout 
The Gondangdia Station building has a modern design with a touch of jenar yellow panels which are still maintained to this day and have never been painted, only the pillars have been repainted to corn yellow. It is known that the project, which began in February 1988, spent Rp. 432.5 billion and at the time it was inaugurated was not fully completed until it was fully operational a year later.

This station has two railway tracks

Services
The following is a list of train services at the Gondangdia Station.

Passenger services 
 KAI Commuter

Supporting transportation

See also

 Rail transport in Indonesia

References

External links
 PT KAI  - the Indonesian rail company

Central Jakarta
Railway stations in Jakarta